Saayam is a 2022 Indian Tamil-language drama film written and directed by Antony Samy. Abi Saravanan, Shiny and Ponvannan appear in the lead roles. Produced by White Lamp Productions, it was released on 4 February 2022.

Cast

Production 
Abi Saravanan revealed that he was working on Saayam during late 2016, and reconfirmed that the film was still in production during 2021. Shiny, who had earlier appeared in India Pakistan (2015) was cast as the lead actress.

Release 
The film was released on 4 February 2022 across theatres in Tamil Nadu. A critic from the Dinamalar gave the film two stars out of five. A reviewer from Maalai Malar mentioned that the film was "disappointing". Critic from Dinamalar gave 2 ratings out of 5 ratings.

References

External links 
 

2020s Tamil-language films
2022 films
Indian drama films
2022 directorial debut films
2022 drama films